Trichopterygini is a tribe of geometer moths under subfamily Larentiinae. The tribe was described by Warren in 1894.

Recognized genera

References

 "Tribus Trichopterygini Warren, 1894". BioLib.cz.

External links
 

 
Larentiinae
Moth tribes